Ilya Valentinovich Skrobotov (born 6 July 2000) is a Russian football player who plays for Isloch Minsk Raion.

Club career
He made his debut in the Russian Premier League for FC Zenit Saint Petersburg on 1 April 2018 in a game against FC Ufa as a 90th minute substitute for Igor Smolnikov.

In his second game for Zenit's main squad on 18 April 2018 he scored an added-time goal to give his club a 2–1 win over FC Dynamo Moscow. He made his first starting lineup appearance in the next league game against FC Arsenal Tula on 22 April 2018, but manager Roberto Mancini substituted him with Igor Smolnikov after just 23 minutes of play "for tactical reasons".

Career statistics

References

External links
 
 
 

2000 births
Footballers from Saint Petersburg
Living people
Russian footballers
Russia youth international footballers
Expatriate footballers in Belarus
Association football defenders
FC Zenit Saint Petersburg players
FC Zenit-2 Saint Petersburg players
FC Isloch Minsk Raion players
Russian Premier League players
Russian First League players
Russian Second League players